Hopton Cangeford is a civil parish in Shropshire, England.  It contains four listed buildings that are recorded in the National Heritage List for England.  Of these, one is at Grade II*, the middle of the three grades, and the others are at Grade II, the lowest grade.  The parish contains the village of Hopton Cangeford and the surrounding countryside, and the listed buildings consist of a farmhouse, a private house, a telephone kiosk, and a redundant church.


Key

Buildings

References

Citations

Sources

Lists of buildings and structures in Shropshire